The UP Targa is a German single-place paraglider that was designed and produced by UP Europe of Kochel am See. Introduced in 2002, production of the final version, the Targa 3, ended in 2007.

Design and development
The Targa was designed as a competition glider and named for Targe shield.

The design progressed through three generations of models, the Targa, Targa 2 and Targa 3. The models are each named for their relative size.

Variants

Targa
Produced from 2002 to 2004.
Targa S
Small-sized model for lighter pilots. The glider model is not certified.
Targa M
Mid-sized model for medium-weight pilots. The glider model is not certified.
Targa L
Large-sized model for heavier pilots. The glider model is not certified.

Targa 2
Produced from 2005 to 2006.
Targa 2 XXS
Extra extra small-sized model for lighter pilots. The glider model is not certified.
Targa 2 XS
Extra small-sized model for lighter pilots. The glider model is not certified.
Targa 2 S
Small-sized model for lighter pilots. The glider model is not certified.
Targa 2 SM
Small-medium-sized model for lighter pilots. The glider model is not certified.
Targa 2 M
Mid-sized model for medium-weight pilots. The glider model is not certified.
Targa 2 ML
Mediaum-large-sized model for heavier pilots. The glider model is not certified.
Targa 2 L
Large-sized model for heavier pilots. The glider model is not certified.
Targa 2 XL
Extra large-sized model for much heavier pilots. The glider model is not certified.
Targa 2 XXL
Extra-extra large-sized model for much heavier pilots. The glider model is not certified.

Targa 3
Produced from 2006 to 2007.

Specifications (Targa 2 M)

References

External links

Targa
Paragliders